Cochlodina orthostoma is a species of air-breathing land snail, a terrestrial pulmonate gastropod mollusk in the family Clausiliidae, the door snails, all of which have a clausilium.

Distribution
Its native distribution is Central European and Eastern European. It occurs in:

 Czech Republic
 Slovakia
 Ukraine
 and others

Description
The weight of the adult live snail is about 74.7±5.3 mg.

Ecology
The habitat of this species is woodland.

References

Clausiliidae
Gastropods described in 1828